Adolphine Eduardina Kok (August 2, 1879 in Rotterdam – August 20, 1928 in Rotterdam) was a Dutch lawyer. She became the first female lawyer in the Netherlands in 1903.

The specialty of Kok was marriage law, later she broadened her field of work, for several years having a seat in the Guardianship Council of Rotterdam, and in 1922 she wrote a preliminary recommendation on the modernization of matrimonial property law concerning marriages in the community of goods for the Brotherhood of Candidate Notaries.

References

1879 births
1928 deaths
Dutch women lawyers
20th-century Dutch lawyers
20th-century women lawyers
20th-century Dutch women